Justin Tinucci is an American actor, musician and professional indoor skydiver who is best known for his roles on Incredible Crew as a recurring guest star, iCarly, Big Love, Trophy Wife and the Netflix show Lady Dynamite where he plays Jason. He will appear in an upcoming Sony Pictures Home Entertainment film called Devil's Whisper in 2017.

Early life
Tinucci was born on January 14, 1999, in Denver, Colorado. After a brief appearance on iCarly at the age of 10, his family relocated to California to pursue his interest in acting.

Sports career
Tinucci is a competitive indoor skydiver. In March 2009, at the age of 10, he and his sister Kayla broke the Guinness World Record for longest indoor free-fall flying in a tunnel for 1 hour, 34 minutes and 40 seconds straight at Air Kix Wind Tunnel in Milton Keynes, UK. As part of Team Future, he and his sister Kayla Tinucci, became the first children to compete against adult international skydiving champions and together have defeated over 200 adult competitors.

Acting career
At the beginning of his career, Tinucci appeared in several shorts including I Love You Daddy, Stanley, Recess and A Story of Beauty. He has also appeared in supporting roles in The Muppets and the feature film Standing Up. (also known as Goat Island) alongside Chandler Canterbury, Annalise Basso and Val Kilmer. His role in this film earned him a nomination to the 35th Young Artist Award for Best Supporting Young Actor in a Feature Film.

Tinucci has also appeared as a recurring guest star on Incredible Crew, and as a guest star on HBO's Big Love, ABC's Trophy Wife and Lady Dynamite.

In 2016 he was cast for a large supporting role in the feature film Devil's Whisper.

Personal life
Tinucci attends the California State University at Northdrige to pursue a degree in media composition while still acting. He is also the co-founder of The Shoe Crew; a charity that gives new athletic shoes to underprivileged youth. Since 2012 they have given over 10,000 pairs of new shoes to kids in need.

Filmography

Film

Television

References

External links
 Official Website
 

American male actors
American male musicians
American skydivers
1999 births
Living people